Charles Legh Naylor (14 October 1869 – 22 November 1945) was a composer and organist based in Harrogate.

Life

He was the son of John Naylor and Mary Ann Chatwin. His father was organist of York Minster from 1883 to 1897.

He was educated at St Peter's School, York and later he was awarded a first class degree in music from Emmanuel College, Cambridge in 1890.

He married Ada Emily Binns in Scarborough in 1902, and they had:
Carolina Mary Naylor, b. 1905

Appointments

Organist at Emmanuel College, Cambridge 1889 - 1892
Deputy organist at York Minster 1891 - 1892
Organist at St. Peter's Church, Harrogate 1892 - 1902
Conductor of the Kursaal Orchestra, Harrogate 1902 - 1911
Organist of All Souls, Blackman Lane, Leeds 1911 - 1917
Organist at St. Peter's Church, Harrogate 1917 - 1935

Compositions

He was the musical advisor to the Methodist School Hymnal and composed 50 tunes for it.  He also composed: 
psalm chants
Communion Service in D 1883
O Perfect Love 1889
Where sunless Rivers weep 1892
Lead Kindly Light 1895
God that Madest Earth and Heaven 1896
Through the Day thy love has spared us 1898
Ye Mariners of England. 1900
We sing a song of Christmas-time 1909
Will God in Very Deed dwell with men 1926

References

1869 births
1945 deaths
English organists
British male organists
English composers
People from Scarborough, North Yorkshire
People educated at St Peter's School, York
Alumni of Emmanuel College, Cambridge